Marissa can refer to:

Maresha or Marissa, an ancient city in Israel
Marissa, Illinois, a town in Illinois
Marissa Township, St. Clair County, Illinois
Marissa (name), a female given name, including a list of persons and fictional characters with the name
Vita Marissa (born 1981), Indonesian badminton player

See also 
MS Princesa Marissa, a cruise ship operated by Louis Cruise Lines